Ladki Sahyadri Ki (Girl From Sahyadri) is a 1966 Hindi social drama film directed by V. Shantaram. Also called Iye Marathichiye Nagari (The Land of Maharashtra) in Marathi, it was a bilingual for V. Shantaram productions under the Rajkamal Kalamandir banner. The music was composed by Vasant Desai, with lyrics by Bharat Vyas. The cast included Sandhya, Shalini Abhyankar, Vatsala Deshmukh, Kumar Dighe, Keshavrao Date, and Baburao Pendharkar.

The story revolves around Rani, a stage performer from an impoverished family, and her attempts to help repair a temple in her village.

Plot
Rani (Sandhya) and her family are poor, but she is not allowed to work when offered a job in a theatrical company, as it is against the custom of her family to have girls working. However, she takes on the job when the village temple needs money for repairs. The stage-owner starts drinking and makes inappropriate advances to Rani. When she snubs him, he stops the work on the temple restoration. Rani is separated from her family, but finally reunites with them and has the temple completed.

Cast 
 Sandhya as Rani
 Prabhakar Pansikar as Som Dutt
 Kumar Dighe as Balasab
 Ganesh Solanki
 Keshavrao Date
 Shalini Abhyankar
 Vatsala Deshmukh
 Baburao Pendharkar
 Manjiri Gadkar

Soundtrack
The music composed by Vasant Desai, had a bhajan in the voice of Pandit Jasraj "Vandana Karo Archana Karo" in Raga Ahir Bhairav. Pandit Jasraj sang only four songs in four films, Ladki Sahayadri Ki (1966), Birbal My Brother (1975) and 1920 (2008) and Anant Mahadevan's Gour Hari Dastaan (2013). He had, however, composed music for Mira Nair's Salaam Bombay (1988).

The background music was also by Vasant Desai, who had parted ways with Shantaram following Navrang. However, on Shantaram's request, he returned to compose music for Geet Gaya Pattharon Ne and Ladki Sahyadri Ki. The lyricist for Ladki Sahyadri Ki  was Bharat Vyas, and the singers were Pandit Jasraj, Asha Bhosle, Amar Shaikh, Mahendra Kapoor and Suman Kalyanpur.

Song list

References

External links

1966 films
1960s Hindi-language films
1960s Marathi-language films
Films directed by V. Shantaram
Films scored by Vasant Desai